Foy Willing (May 14, 1914 – July 24, 1978) was an American singer, songwriter, musician, and bandleader, who performed Western music and appeared in Western movies. He formed the band Riders of the Purple Sage.

Early years
Foy Lopez Willingham was born in Iredell, Texas, United States. He began his career while attending high school in Texas by working at a local radio station. In 1933, he traveled to New York City to further his radio career. In 1940, he moved to Oklahoma, and in 1942 to California where he became popular during the Golden Age of Radio.

Riders of the Purple Sage
In 1942, Willing co-founded Foy Willing and the Riders of the Purple Sage, with Iowa musician Al Sloey. The band included Patti Page on vocals, fiddler Johnny Paul, and accordionist Ken Coopern. The band's first hit, "Texas Blues", was written by Willing. They grew in fame and over their ten-year career, performed as the musical group backing up Monte Hale and Roy Rogers for Republic Studios.

Willing and his band appeared as performers in many Western movies in the 1940s and early 1950s with Charles Starrett, Monte Hale, and Roy Rogers and Dale Evans. The Willing-led Riders of the Purple Sage disbanded in 1952.

Later years
During the late 1950s and early 1960s, Foy Willing and the Riders of the Purple Sage occasionally reunited to record and perform, and Willing went on to appear at Western festivals during the 1970s. Willing also traveled with Gene Autry during Autry's North American tour. On October 30, 1963, Les Paul sued Mary Ford for divorce, in Hackensack, New Jersey, charging that Ford left Paul for Willing. In 1966, Willing married Sharon Lee.

Willing died on July 24, 1978, in Nashville, Tennessee, of a heart attack.

Discography
 2007 Tumbling Tumbleweeds (Varese Sarabande)
 2005 And the Riders of the Purple Sage (BACM)
 2005 Timber Trail (Cattle)
 2005 Trail Herdin' Cowboy
 2003 Sagebrush Swing (Collectors' Choice Music)
 1999 Cowboy/New Sound of American Folk (DRG)
 1998 Collectors Edition (Pickwick)
 1962 The New Sound of American Folk
 1958 Cowboy
 1950 Riders of the Purple Sage

Filmography
 1951 "Texas Carnival"
 1951 "Disc Jockey"
 1951 Heart of the Rockies
 1951 Spoilers of the Plains
 1950 Trail of Robin Hood
 1950 North of the Great Divide
 1950 Sunset in the West
 1950 Trigger, Jr.
 1950 Twilight in the Sierras
 1950 Bells of Coronado
 1949 The Golden Stallion
 1949 Down Dakota Way
 1949 Susanna Pass
 1948 The Far Frontier
 1948 Grand Canyon Trail
 1948 The Timber Trail
 1948 California Firebrand
 1947 Under Colorado Skies
 1947 Along the Oregon Trail
 1947 Last Frontier Uprising
 1946 Out California Way
 1945 Saddle Serenade
 1945 Sing Me a Song of Texas
 1944 Cyclone Prairie Rangers
 1944 Cowboy from Lonesome River
 1944 Swing in the Saddle
 1944 Twilight on the Prairie
 1944 Sundown Valley
 1944 Cowboy Canteen
 1943 Cowboy in the Clouds
 1941 Royal Mounted Patrol
 1941 Prairie Stranger

References

1914 births
1978 deaths
American bandleaders
20th-century American musicians
20th-century American male musicians